The National Weather Service Gray/Portland, Maine (GYX) is a local office of the National Weather Service responsible for monitoring weather conditions over western Maine and all of New Hampshire. It is situated in Gray, Maine, in the metropolitan area of Portland, in a rural setting.

Mission 

The National Weather Service in Gray provides weather, hydrologic, and climate forecasts and warnings for western Maine, New Hampshire, and adjacent waters for the protection of life and property and the enhancement of the national economy.

Observation network 
The National Weather Service in Gray is responsible for observing equipment at Portland, Augusta, Wiscasset, and Fryeburg in Maine; and Concord, Manchester, Rochester, Lebanon, Berlin, Jaffrey, and Whitefield in New Hampshire. The FAA or other organizations maintain the equipment in Lewiston-Auburn, Rockland, Waterville, Sanford, and Rangeley in Maine; and Laconia, Keene, Nashua, and Plymouth in New Hampshire.

The site in Gray has a WSR-88D weather radar, part of the NEXRAD network, which Reflectivity/Doppler/dual polarization high resolution data cover an area of about  around the station, or roughly the area of responsibility of the NWS Forecasting Office in Gray (long range reflectivity data cover about double of this).

Colocated is a radiosonde facility from which a weather balloon is released twice daily to obtain temperature, humidity and winds in the troposphere above Maine. It is part of a network of such facilities across United States, run by the NWS, which in turn is part of the World Weather Watch.

Photos

References

External links
 NWS Gray/Portland's website
 Facebook page of the office

Gray, Maine
Gray, Maine